The sixth edition of the Johan Cruyff Shield was held on 12 August 2001 between 2000–01 Eredivisie champions PSV Eindhoven and 2000–01 KNVB Cup winners FC Twente. PSV won the match 3–2.

Match

Details

References

2001
Johan Cruijff-schaal
j
j
Johan Cruyff Shield